University Museum is a common shorthand name for a number of University museums and may refer to:

Oxford University Museum of Natural History
University of Pennsylvania Museum of Archaeology and Anthropology
University Museum and Art Gallery at the University of Hong Kong
University Museum (Harvard University)
University Museum (Southern Illinois University Carbondale)